Constance of Burgundy (8 May 1046 – 1093) was the daughter of Duke Robert I of Burgundy and Helie de Semur-en-Brionnais.  She was Queen of Castile and León by her marriage to Alfonso VI of León and Castile. She was the granddaughter of King Robert II of France, the second monarch of the French Capetian dynasty. She was the mother of Urraca of León, who succeeded her father in both Castile and León.

Life
In 1065, Constance married her first husband, Hugh II, Count of Chalon. They were married for fourteen years until Hugh's death in 1079, they had no children.

In late 1079, Constance remarried to Alfonso VI of León and Castile. The marriage appears to have been orchestrated via the Cluniac connections at Alfonso's court.  He had previously been married to Agnes of Aquitaine, whom he had either divorced or had been widowed by. The marriage of Constance and Alfonso initially faced papal opposition, apparently due to a kinship between Constance and Agnes.

Constance and Alfonso had several children but only one of these lived to adulthood:
Urraca (b. April 1079 – March 8, 1126) Queen of Castile and León in her own right. Married firstly to Raymond of Burgundy. Married secondly to Alfonso the Battler, no issue.

Constance died in 1093 leaving her fourteen-year-old daughter and her husband a widower. He went on to marry three further wives after her death, but only had a son by his Muslim mistress, Zaida of Seville.

Burial 
After her death, the corpse of Constance was taken to the town of Sahagún and was buried in the Monastery of St. Facundo and Primitivo, where her husband, King Alfonso VI would be buried along with all his wives.

The grave that contained the remains of Alfonso VI was destroyed in 1810 during a fire in the Monastery. The remains of the king and several of his wives, including those of Constance, were collected and kept in the abbot's chamber until 1821. When the religious were expelled from the monastery, they were then deposited by Abbot Ramon Joys in a box that was placed on the south wall of the chapel of the Crucifix, until, in January 1835, the remains were collected and placed in another box, being brought to the archive. The purpose was to place all remaining interests in a new sanctuary that was being built then. However, when the monastery of San Benito was disentailed in 1835, the monks gave the two boxes containing the actual remains to the relative of a priest, who hid them until 1902 were found by the professor Zamora Rodrigo Fernández Núñez.

Today, the remains of Alfonso VI are buried in the Royal Monastery of San Benito in Sahagún, at the foot of the temple, in a stone chest covered with smooth, modern marble and in a tomb near equally plain, lie the remains of several of the king's wives, including those of Constance.

References

Bibliography

 

 

|-

|-

1046 births
1093 deaths
Hispanic empresses and queens
Castilian queen consorts
Leonese queen consorts
Galician queens consort
House of Burgundy
11th-century Spanish women
11th-century people from the Kingdom of León